Mahata is a village in Bhatar CD block in Bardhaman Sadar North subdivision of Purba Bardhaman district in the state of West Bengal, India with total 1,311 families residing.

History
Census 2011 Mahata Village Location Code or Village Code 319789. The village of Mahata is located in the Bhatar tehsil of Burdwan district in West Bengal, India.

Transport 

Population 
Mahata village of Barddhaman has substantial population of Schedule Caste. Schedule Caste (SC) constitutes 32.35% while Schedule Tribe (ST) were 21.97% of total population in Mahata village.

Population and house data

Healthcare
Nearest Rural Hospital at Bhatar (with 60 beds) is the main medical facility in Bhatar CD block. There are primary health centres.

School
Mahata High F.P. School.

References 

Villages in Purba Bardhaman district
Populated places in West Bengal